Vadia is a census town in Narmada district in the Indian state of Gujarat.

Demographics
As of 2001 India census, Vadia had a population of 4479. Males constitute 59% of the population and females 41%. Vadia has an average literacy rate of 84%, higher than the national average of 59.5%: male literacy is 90%, and female literacy is 76%. In Vadia, 6% of the population is under 6 years of age.

References

Villages in Narmada district